= Keith Valley =

Valley in Catoosa County, Georgia, United States

Coordinates: 34°53′57.28″N 85°1′58.81″W

Keith Valley is a valley in the U.S. state of Georgia.

Keith Valley was named for the local Keith family of pioneer settlers.
